Minni ritchi is a type of reddish-brown bark that continuously peels in small curly flakes, leaving the tree looking like it has a coat of red curly hair.  Brooker and Kleinig (1990) formally described it as a bark type in which "the outer rich, red-brown smooth bark splits both longitudinally and horizontally, the free edges rolling back without completely detaching to expose new green bark beneath".

A number of species of Acacia and Eucalyptus have minni ritchi bark, including:
 Acacia curranii
 Acacia cyperophylla (creekline miniritchie)
 Acacia delibrata
 Acacia gracillima
 Acacia grasbyi (miniritchie)
 Acacia monticola
 Acacia rhodophloia
 Acacia trachycarpa
 Eucalyptus caesia (gungurru, 'Silver Princess')
 Eucalyptus crucis (narrow-leaved silver mallee)
 Eucalyptus minniritchi
 Eucalyptus orbifolia

References

Plant morphology
Plant common names